TWAN or Twan may refer to:
 The World At Night, an international photographic effort to present photos and videos of the night sky
 Twan, a Dutch-language given name
 Twan River District, district of Liberia